Ekhirit-Bulagatsky District (Ekhired Bulagadai aimag) is an administrative district of Ust-Orda Buryat Okrug of Irkutsk Oblast, Russia, one of the thirty-three in the oblast. Municipally, it is incorporated as Ekhirit-Bulagatsky Municipal District. It is located in the south of the oblast. Its administrative center is the rural locality (a settlement) of Ust-Ordynsky. As of the 2010 Census, the total population of the district was 30,597, with the population of Ust-Ordynsky accounting for 48.7% of that number.

References

Notes

Sources

Registry of the Administrative-Territorial Formations of Irkutsk Oblast 

Districts of Irkutsk Oblast